Saviour Darmanin (born 7 February 1977 in Pietà, Malta) is a Maltese former professional footballer, who was most recently working with Maltese First Division side Vittoriosa Stars, where he was the club's assistant manager. During his career, he played as a goalkeeper. Saviour is remembered for being part of the Valletta squad that beat Juventus in 2008, where he saved a shot to win Valletta the game in the penalty shoot-out. Also, he now runs his own goalkeeping school in Malta.

Honours 

Valletta

Winner

 1994–95 Maltese First Division
 2002–03 Carlsberg Tournament
 2003–04 Rothmans International Tournament
 2004–05 Maltese FA Trophy
 2005–06 Gozo Freedom Cup
 2008–09 Maltese Premier League
 2008–09 Bet Fair Cup vs Juventus

External links 

 Saviour Darmanin Official Website
 Saviour Darmanin's Goalkeeping School Website
 Saviour Darmanin at MaltaFootball.com
 
 

1977 births
Living people
Maltese footballers
Malta international footballers
Pietà Hotspurs F.C. players
Birkirkara F.C. players
Għajnsielem F.C. players
Valletta F.C. players
Marsaxlokk F.C. players
Association football goalkeepers
Maltese expatriate footballers
People from Pietà, Malta